is a video game released in arcades by Tehkan and Sun Electronics in 1981. The game was licensed to Centuri for distribution in the United States. It was ported to the Arcadia 2001 console. An enhanced version was released in Japan as Route-16 Turbo for the Famicom in 1985, and in 2001 as part of the PlayStation game Sunsoft Memorial Vol. 2.

Gameplay
The player controls a car and must explore a maze divided into sixteen rooms. The player must collect all the money bags while avoiding colliding with opponents' cars or running out of fuel. Every time the player goes out of a room, a map is shown, indicating the position of every car and all the money bags. There are also flags that can be driven over to invert the roles, so the player can crash the opposite cars and stop them for a few seconds, while getting bonus points.

Legacy

, an improved version of Route-16 for the Famicom, was published on October 4, 1985, by Sunsoft only in Japan. Route-16 Turbo added multiple difficulty levels and improved graphics and music. 

Due to a programming bug, the Famicom version will never recognise that round 9 is completed, preventing players from going further without emulation. It is unknown whether it is present on the PlayStation version.

Notes

References

External links

1981 video games
Maze games
Racing video games
Nintendo Entertainment System games
Nintendo Switch games
PlayStation (console) games
PlayStation 4 games
Sunsoft games
Arcade video games
Video games developed in Japan
Hamster Corporation games